Chilobrachys fimbriatus, commonly known as the Indian Violet Earth Tiger Tarantula usually shortened to Indian Violet Tarantula, is a species of spider of the genus Chilobrachys. It is endemic to India, and was first described by Reginald Innes Pocock in 1899.

Description 
Females live 20 to 25 years, while males only live to 5. The carapace is a light brown or golden color, the opisthosoma is a reddish brown color with black chevrons. The legs are a blueish greyish color, with a deep black femur.

Habitat 
They live in the tropical regions of western India, near the coast. The average temperature is 27ºC, with average yearly precipitation of 2900mm. There are plants such as the coconut palm, Banyan and Sacred fig, with animals such as  kingfishers, mouse deers, and Indian Giant Squirrel.

Behavior 
They are burrowing tarantulas, which like most will try to flee at first, if consistently provoked it will probably bite, with their probably painful venom and bite. They make incredible tunnels and webs under the surface, where they will stay at day, whereas at night they might be seen outside.

See also 
 List of Theraphosidae species

References

Theraphosidae
Spiders of Asia
Endemic fauna of India
Spiders described in 1895